SpVgg Unterhaching are a German football club which are based in Unterhaching. During the 2013-14 season they will compete in the following competitions: 3.Liga, Regional Cup Bayern.

Squad

Competitions

3.Liga

League table

Results summary

Matches

References 

SpVgg Unterhaching seasons
Unterhaching